TextMagic is a SaaS-based A2P messaging service that allows SMBs to connect with their customers via two-way SMS messages, online texts, gateway SMS via email, SMS software for desktop, and SMS distribution lists.

TextMagic is operated by TextMagic AS, a publicly-traded company with its headquarters in Estonia.

History 
TextMagic was founded in 2001 by Dan Houghton in the United Kingdom. In 2013, Monday Media OÜ, a holding company of Estonian tech executive Priit Vaikmaa, acquired 55% of TextMagic Ltd.

The company's shares were sold in an initial public offering, with the first day of trading 15 December 2021.

As part of the IPO, TextMagic aimed to raise up to €2.5 million via the issue of up to 500,000 new ordinary shares. Altogether, 15,410 investors subscribed for 9,896,434 shares, totalling €49.5 million.

The IPO established TextMagic as the locally listed Estonian firm with the largest number of shareholders, with an oversubscription rate of 19.8.

See also
Unified communications

References 

Companies based in Cambridge
Companies established in 2001